

Championship recognition

Public Acclamation:  1884 to 1921
Champions were recognized by wide public acclamation. A heavyweight champion was a boxer who had a notable win over another notable boxer and then went without defeat. Retirements from the ring periodically led to a "true" champion going unrecognized, or for several to be recognized by the public for periods of time. Typically, public interest in having a single, "true" champion resulted in claimants to the heavyweight title being matched with one another; the winner of that bout was subsequently deemed the champion, with the claim (and title lineage) of the defeated boxer largely forgotten.

Sanctioning Bodies:  1921 to present 
The National Boxing Association (NBA), was formed in 1921 as the first organization aimed at regulating boxing on a national (and later global) level. The prominence of New York City as the epicenter of boxing would lead to a governmental entity, the powerful New York State Athletic Commission (NYSAC), to join the NBA in sanctioning bouts as "world championships." A third entity, with lesser public recognition inside the USA, the European Boxing Union (EBU), would follow suit, with this triumvirate typically (but not always) recognizing the same boxers as world champions.

At its 1962 convention the NBA's non-U.S. members exploited a membership rule and took control of the organization, rebranding it the World Boxing Association. The (WBA), was joined a year later by a combination of state and national boxing commissions (including the NYSAC and IBU) to form a separate sanctioning body, the World Boxing Council (WBC). Each organization would later have a spin-off competing sanctioning body emerge:  the International Boxing Federation (IBF), which was formed by members of the United States Boxing Association in 1983; and the World Boxing Organization (WBO), which was formed in 1989. A fifth significant (but not as publicly accepted) body came in the form of the International Boxing Organization (IBO), in 1991, and today there are over a dozen sanctioning organizations, of varying degrees of public acceptance, sanctioning bouts as for a world championship and proclaiming their title winners "Champion of the World."

See also
List of current boxing champions
List of current female world boxing champions
List of undisputed boxing champions
 List of WBA world champions
 List of WBC world champions
 List of IBF world champions
 List of WBO world champions
List of The Ring world champions
 List of British world boxing champions

References

External links

Featherweight Champions

World boxing champions by weight class